K-1 PREMIUM 2005 Dynamite!! was an annual kickboxing and mixed martial arts event held by K-1 and Hero's on New Year's Eve, Sunday, December 31, 2005 at the Osaka Dome in Osaka, Japan. It featured 7 HERO'S MMA rules fights, and 4 K-1 rules fights.

The event attracted a sellout crowd of 53,025 to the Osaka Dome, and was broadcast across Japan on the TBS Network.

In the main event, Norifumi "KID" Yamamoto defeated Genki Sudo in the finals of the Hero's Middleweight Tournament to become the first HERO'S Middleweight Champion.

The semi final match was a modified rules bout between Royce Gracie and Hideo Tokoro, which was declared a draw.

Results

2005 Hero's Middleweight (154 lbs) Grand Prix

See also
List of K-1 events
List of male kickboxers
PRIDE Shockwave 2005

References

External links
K-1 Official Website

K-1 events
Hero's events
2005 in kickboxing
2005 in mixed martial arts
Kickboxing in Japan
Mixed martial arts in Japan
Sport in Osaka